Jeff Hatrix, also known as Jeffrey Nothing (born Jeffrey Lewis Hetrick), is an American musician, best known as the former clean vocalist for the heavy metal band Mushroomhead. His nickname comes from a scene in Blue Velvet. With a wide variety of face paint and mask designs, Jeffrey's most known look is that of a butcher. However, he revealed a new look in the music video of "Your Soul Is Mine", showing a tan skin mask that somewhat resembles the infamous Leatherface from the Texas Chainsaw Massacre movies. Two of his masks were made from face-molds of famous actors Christopher Lloyd and Bela Lugosi. His most recent incarnation is that of a mask resembling human hands. He is signed as a solo artist to Suburban Noize Records.

Personal life 
Hatrix was born Jeffrey Lewis Hetrick in Cleveland, Ohio. He grew up going to church and left at age 12 when he became agnostic. He is now a born-again Christian. He is married and also has a daughter from a previous relationship.

Career 
Hatrix was the co-founder and clean vocalist of the Cleveland-based metal band Mushroomhead. He was also the singer of the Cleveland-based thrash metal band Hatrix, as well as fronting the band Purgatory in the mid-1980s. Hatrix also plays guitar in the band Foose, under the stage name "Bob Keeshan".
In June 2007, Hatrix launched his own clothing line. In 2011, he began to pursue acting and starred in the movie 13th Sign with ex-Mushroomhead vocalist Waylon Reavis.

On New Year's Day 2011, Hatrix announced that The New Psychodalia album will be "Coming Very Soon" via his personal Facebook account. In June 2011, Hatrix's solo band Nothing signed to Suburban Noize Records.

When asked about the upcoming record, Hatrix stated: "The whole album is about escaping reality. People choose a variety of ways to feel better in the face of the depression that can be caused by trying to survive in a world that can seem completely uncaring and smothering," commented Nothing about the album. "'The New Psychodalia' is like a new safe hallucinogenic that makes all the ugliness in the world beautiful, with no harmful side effects. The entire album is kind of like a twisted, thought provoking view of the truths. It exposes the lies of the American dream that has really become more of a nightmare."

On August 22, 2011, Hatrix debuted the first single from The New Psychodalia on RevolverMag.com.

On March 7, 2018, Hatrix announced that he had left Mushroomhead.

Hatrix will be appearing in the upcoming horror film Dwellers, which is being directed by Drew Fortier and produced by David Ellefson and Thom Hazaert, via their newly formed production company, Ellefson Films.

All bands and projects 
Here are all the bands or projects that Hatrix has been in:
White Heat
Purgatory
 Hatrix
Mushroomhead
Foose
Nothing

Solo band members 

Current members
Jeff "Jeffrey Nothing" Hatrix – lead vocals (2010–2014, 2018–present)
Tommy Church (of My Beautiful Suicide, Skin and A Killer's Confession, formerly of Tenafly Viper, The Autumn Offering and Mushroomhead) – guitars, keyboards, bass (2012–2014, 2018–present)
Ian D Sniesak (of My Beautiful Suicide, Skin) – co-lead vocals (2018–present)
Noah "Shark" Robertson (formerly of The Browning and Motograter) – drums (2018–present)
Steven Lee Adams – bass (2019–present)

Past members

Kahler Jakee (Hatrix) (Ex Skin/ Mechanical Avalanche. Currently Silent Schroeder.) – bass (2018–2019)
Micheal Crough (formerly of Proon) – bass (2011–2012)
Joe "Murdernickle" Kilcoyne (formerly of Mystik, Spudmonsters, Mushroomhead) – bass (2011)
Ryan Farrell (of Mushroomhead) – guitars, keyboards, bass (2010–2014)
Steve "Skinny" Felton (of Mushroomhead) – drums, backing vocals (2010–2014)

Timeline

Discography 
With White Heat
 White Heat Demo (1982)

With Purgatory
 Purgatory E.P. (1985)
 Purgatory Demo (1985)
 Tied To the Trax (1986)

With Hatrix
 Collisioncoursewithnoplace (1994)

With Mushroomhead
 Mushroomhead (1995)
 Superbuick (1996)
 Remix (1997)
 M3 (1999)
 XX (2001)
 Remix 2000 (2002)
 XIII (2003)
 Savior Sorrow (2006)
 Beautiful Stories for Ugly Children (2010)
 The Righteous & the Butterfly (2014)

As Jeffrey Nothing
 The New Psychodalia (2011)

References

External links 
 Jeffrey Nothing MySpace
 Jeffrey Nothing Facebook Page

American Christians
American heavy metal singers
American industrial musicians
American male singer-songwriters
American rock songwriters
American singer-songwriters
Industrial metal musicians
Living people
Nu metal singers
Year of birth missing (living people)